"One in a Million" is a single released from the album One in a Million by Swedish artist Bosson in 2000.

The song was part of the soundtrack for the 2000 movie Miss Congeniality and was nominated for a Golden Globe for "Best Original Song – Motion Picture". It became a Top 10 hit in Europe and Asia in 2000 and 2001.

Track listing

Charts

Weekly charts

Year-end charts

Certifications and sales

References

2000 singles
2000 songs
Bosson songs
Capitol Records singles
EMI Records singles
Number-one singles in South Africa